David Wayne Smith is an American former professional baseball pitcher. He played baseball in college for the Lamar University Cardinals.

Notes

References

Retrosheet
Venezuelan Professional Baseball League

1957 births
Living people
American expatriate baseball players in Canada
Baseball players from Texas
California Angels players
Cardenales de Lara players
Edmonton Trappers players
Grays Harbor Loggers players
Holyoke Millers players
Jackson Mets players
Lamar Cardinals baseball players
Leones del Caracas players
American expatriate baseball players in Venezuela
Lynchburg Mets players
Major League Baseball pitchers
Midland Angels players
Nashua Angels players
People from Tomball, Texas
Sportspeople from Harris County, Texas